Nadira is a given name common in Asian countries. It may refer to

Given name
 Nadira (actress), an Indian actress of the 1950s and 1960s, best known for her roles as a temptress
 Nadira (Pakistani actress), Pakistani actress in Punjabi and Urdu films
 Nadira Ait Oumghar (born 1994), Algerian volleyball player
 Nadira Babbar (born 1948), Indian actress and producer 
 Nadira Banu Begum (died 1659), Mughal princess
 Nadira Begg, Canadian television journalist
 Nadira Isayeva, Russian journalist
 Nadira Naipaul (born 1953), Pakistani journalist
 Nodira (sometimes spelled in Russian as Nadira, 1792 – 1842), Uzbek writer, wife of Muhammad Umar Khan
 Nina Nadira Naharuddin (born 1992), Malaysian singer, actress and TV host

Fictional characters
 One of the villains in Power Rangers: Time Force
 Nadira, a character in the 2005 novel Skybreaker by Kenneth Oppel
 Al-Nadirah, character of the Hatra legend

See also
 Nadir (name)

Feminine given names